In music, the term slap tonguing refers to a musician playing a single-reed instrument such as a clarinet or a saxophone employing a technique to produce a popping sound along with the note.

The technique
The sound is created as a result of the release of suction in the mouth and the popping sound that the reed produces which amplifies as it travels through the horn.

To create this effect, lay your tongue against a lot of the reed. Gently push upward so that the tip and rail of the reed is closed. Get rid of as much air in the oral cavity as you can and seal off the lip so that you have an airtight fit. The tongue is quickly released in a downward motion. When you release the tongue downward, you also drop your jaw and open your mouth in a "popping" motion. This is all done very quickly. Do not pull the tongue back towards your throat. It needs to pop downward away from the roof of the mouth to get the most volume, do not blow air through the horn and do not inhale when you release your tongue.

Players
The first recorded appearance was by Stump Evans, the C melody saxophone player in the King Oliver band. Other famous players who used the technique were Rudy Wiedoeft, Coleman Hawkins and Fess Williams. Contemporary exponents include Sam Newsome.

External links
A PDF with pictures explaining the technique
Video of Marco Mazzini explaining the slap tongue in the clarinet

Woodwind instruments